Robert S. "Bob" Young, Jr. (born August 28, 1952) is an American television producer. He was born in Knoxville, Tennessee, and the young attended college at the University of Pennsylvania and soon after his graduation began working in stand-up comedy in Philadelphia with fellow comedian Bob Myer in a duo called Myer and Young. Once he moved out to Los Angeles, he began working in television. Young has worked as both a writer and producer on 11 sitcoms. He lives in Los Angeles with his wife Joan and his three children Jesse, Zach, and Ethan.

Television work

Melissa & Joey (2010), writer, producer
Family Affair (2002), writer, producer
Nikki (2000), writer, producer
Smart Guy (1997), writer, producer
Maybe This Time (1995), writer, producer
Boy Meets World (1993), writer, producer
Dinosaurs (1991), writer, producer
Singer & Sons (1990), writer, producer
My Two Dads (1987), writer, producer
227 (1985), writer, producer
Who's the Boss? (1984), consultant
The Facts of Life (1979), writer, producer

External links
 

Living people
University of Pennsylvania alumni
People from Knoxville, Tennessee
1952 births
Television producers from Tennessee